Chittagong College is a government college in Chittagong, Bangladesh. It is the second college established in Bangladesh after Dhaka College. It offers higher secondary education (HSC), bachelor's degree and master's degree.

History 
Having begun as Chattogram District school (now Chittagong Collegiate School) in 1836, it became an intermediate college on 2 January 1869. Its academic activities as a college started at a Portuguese-merchant built building beside the Parade Ground. The first principal was J C Bose. Initially, it used to offer law education, but the subject was suspended in 1909. In the same year it started providing science education in the intermediate section from the 1909. The institute became a graduation college in 1910 after University of Calcutta recognized it as a first class degree college. From then it started providing honours degrees on Arabic, Bengali, Pali, Sanskrit, history, mathematics, physics and chemistry. From 1919 it started supplementary courses on English, economics and philosophy. In 1942, honours courses in Economics started. The college suspended its honours programme in 1955. But, it reintroduced honours courses on English, Bangla, economics, physics, chemistry and mathematics in 1960. B.Sc. (Bachelor of Science) courses on zoology and botany and B.A. (Bachelor of Arts) /B.Sc. (Bachelor of Science) course on statistics were introduced in 1962. In 1926, A. K. Fazlul Huq established Muslim Chattrabash which is now known as Sher-e-Bangla Chattrabas.
The students of this institution participated in Language movement in 1952, Bengali Education movement in 1962 and Bangladesh Liberation War in 1971.

Affiliation

Faculties and departments 

The college teaches honours and offers master's degrees in 17  subjects (present 2018). Science and humanities are course for HSC student. The college has five academic buildings, a library with 60,000 books, a mosque, and an auditorium. The college has three academic buildings. one of them used as a foreign language teaching inclusive arts and an ICT (information and communication technology) lab based building.

Faculty of Arts & Social Science 
The Department of English in Chittagong College is called Royal Department. Famous scholar Subodh Candra Sen Gupta joined in the department in 1933. It opened in 1910.

The faculty comprises the following departments:
 Department of Bengali
 Department of English
 Department of Economics
 Department of Political Science
 Department of History
 Department of Islamic History and Culture
 Department of Philosophy
 Department of Sociology
 Department of Islamic Studies

Faculty of Science 
The faculty comprises the following departments:
 Department of Geography
 Department of Physics
 Department of Chemistry
 Department of Botany
 Department of Zoology
 Department of Statistics
 Department of Mathematics
 Department of Psychology

College facility

Student dormitories 
There are three male and one female student dormitories.
 Saheed Sohrawordy dormitory: "A" block is for Muslim students and "B" block is for non-Muslim students.
 Sher-e-Bangla dormitory
 Dr. Abdus Sabur dormitory: for honours and master's students
 Hazrat Khadizatul Kobra (R) dormitory: for female students
 Shekh Hasina dormitory: for female students

College ground 
The college has a large ground known as Parade Ground. In this five acre ground students from the college and from other colleges play cricket, football, and volleyball. BNCC (Bangladesh National Cadet Corps) uses the ground.

Co-curricular activities
 Chittagong College ECA Club 
 Chittagong College Information Technology Club (XI-XII students only)
 BNCC, the college has the HQ of Karnaphuly battalion-2 of Bangladesh National Cadet Corp. Two Sections are Army Wing and Naval Wing
 Rover Scout
 Red Crescent Society
 Chattogram College Creative Club

Chittagong College Information Technology Club (CCITC) 

Chittagong College Information Technology Club was founded on February 2, 2020. It is a platform that provides students with opportunities to discuss various topics on informatics outside the classroom and enhance the skills of students other than the regular curriculum. Current activities include Programming and Problem Solving, IoT and Robotics, Web Development and Graphic Design, and Data Science and Machine Learning. There is one class per week for any of the above four topics. To attend the classes, being a member is mandatory.

Other facilities 
 Two-storied mosque
 Common rooms for male and female students. The common room for female students is a two-storied building.
 Canteen between the auditorium and the administrative building
 Gymnasium
 Post office
 Pubali Bank, Chittagong College branch
 Medical centre
 Foreign language training center [FLTC]

Notable alumni 

 Muhammad Yunus, awarded the Nobel Peace Prize for founding the Grameen Bank and pioneering the concepts of microcredit and microfinance
 Janardan Chakravarti
 Nalinaksha Dutt.
 Bhabatosh Dutta
 Manabendra Narayan Larma, the founding leader of the Parbatya Chattagram Jana Samhati Samiti
 Fazlul Karim, lawyer, businessman, politician and soldier. He was the first mayor of Cox's Bazar
 Enamul Haque, a Bangladeshi researcher, litterateur and educationist
 Salimullah Khan
 Birendra Kishore Roaza
 Manabendra Narayan Larma
 Asif Iqbal, Bangladeshi lyricist, music composer and corporate personality
 Bir Bahadur Ushwe Sing, is a Bangladeshi politician and Member of Parliament and also Minister of Chittagong Hill Tracts Affairs.
 A J M Nasir Uddin, Bangladeshi Politician, former Mayor of Chittagong and Vice President of Bangladesh Cricket Board.
 Rezaul Karim Chowdhury, Bangladeshi Politician and Current Mayor of Chittagong.

Notable faculty members 
 Beni Madhab Das, he joined in the college in its initial years and made the college as a model institution
 Surendranath Dasgupta, he was a professor of Bangla and Sangskrit in the college
 Subodh Chandra Sengupta, came to dept. of English in this college in 1933 from Presidency College, Kolkata
 Motaher Hussain Chowdhury, a Bengalii writer, was born in Noakhali. He worked in Chittagong College from 1947 to 1956.
 Badruddin Umar
 Abdul Haque Faridi, lecturer

Gallery

See also
 Government Hazi Mohammad Mohshin College
 Education in Bangladesh

References

External links
 Official website
 

 
Academic institutions associated with the Bengal Renaissance
Colleges affiliated to National University, Bangladesh
Colleges in Chittagong
Public colleges in Chittagong
1869 establishments in India
Educational institutions established in 1859